Bassam Al-Ansari (born 1971) is an Emirati swimmer. He competed in three events at the 1988 Summer Olympics.

References

External links

1971 births
Living people
Emirati male swimmers
Olympic swimmers of the United Arab Emirates
Swimmers at the 1988 Summer Olympics
Place of birth missing (living people)